Grégory Galbadon (born 21 January 1973) is a French politician who represented Manche's 3rd constituency in the National Assembly from 2017 to 2018 as a member of En Marche.

Political career 
At the 2017 French legislative election, Galbadon was the substitute candidate for Stéphane Travert in Manche's 3rd constituency. Galbadon became a member of the National Assembly following Travert's appointment to the government as Minister of Agriculture on 22 July 2017. He left Parliament in 2018.

References

External links 
 Official biography at the website of the French Parliament

1973 births
Living people
21st-century French politicians
Deputies of the 15th National Assembly of the French Fifth Republic
Politicians from Normandy
La République En Marche! politicians
People from Coutances
Mayors of places in Normandy